"Love Vibrations" is a 2007 song written, produced and recorded by American singer Barbara Tucker, and her first single to be released from her first full-length album of the same name. This was Tucker's seventh number-one single she placed on the Billboard Hot Dance Club Play chart, reaching the top spot on October 6, 2007.

Track listing
 CD Maxi (US)
 Love Vibrations (Georgie's Radio Mix) 4:10  
 Love Vibrations (Josh Harris' Radio Mix) 3:56  
 Love Vibrations (DJ Escape & Johnny Vicious Radio Edit) 3:49  
 Love Vibrations (Georgie's Love Club Mix) 7:56  
 Love Vibrations (Josh Harris' Club Mix) 7:30  
 Love Vibrations (DJ Escape & Johnny Vicious Main Mix) 9:22  
 Love Vibrations (Supernova Elektricity Mix) 9:51  
 Love Vibrations (Feliciano Classic Mix) 6:46  
 Love Vibrations (Love House Original)  8:03  
 Love Vibrations (Supernova Dub Mix) 9:28

References

External links
Tucker's performance of "Love Vibration" on YouTube
Single release information at Discogs

2007 songs
2007 singles
Barbara Tucker songs
Dance-pop songs
Electronic songs
House music songs